Louis-Marie-Edmond Blanquart de Bailleul (1795, Calais - 1868) was a French Roman Catholic bishop.  He worked as a lawyer for a time, before becoming the third bishop of Versailles (1832-1844) and then archbishop of Rouen (1844-1858).  As bishop of Versailles, on 18 October 1837 he presided over the Catholic marriage service of Princess Marie of Orléans and Duke Alexander of Württemberg at Versailles, and in 1843 he consecrated Versailles's main town church as the cathedral of the 33-year-old diocese.

External links
https://web.archive.org/web/20080227011536/http://www.visite-de-rouen.com/eveques.htm
http://www.cathedrale-versailles.org/histoire_anglais.php

1795 births
1868 deaths
Archbishops of Rouen
Bishops of Versailles
19th-century French Roman Catholic bishops